Kévin Aubeneau (born 10 February 1989 in Niort, Deux-Sèvres) is a goalkeeper currently playing for Championnat de France amateur side Vitré and Etrelles. Between 2007 and 2011 he played for his hometown club Chamois Niortais, where he made 87 league appearances. Aubeneau made his league debut for Niort in the 2–1 victory over US Boulogne in Ligue 2 on 27 July 2007. On 2 June 2011, he joined Ligue 2 club Stade Laval. However, Aubeneau failed to break into the first team at Laval and made only one appearance for the reserve team, and subsequently joined CFA side Les Herbiers on 16 June 2012.

References

External links
Kévin Aubeneau career stats at chamoisfc79.fr

1989 births
Living people
People from Niort
French footballers
Association football goalkeepers
Chamois Niortais F.C. players
Stade Lavallois players
Les Herbiers VF players
AS Vitré players
Ligue 2 players
Championnat National players
Sportspeople from Deux-Sèvres
Footballers from Nouvelle-Aquitaine